The Wooden Trumpet (truba Lihava, Cossack Trumpet, Sihnal'na truba).
The truba, or lihava, is an instrument of the surma-horn type, only with a mouthpiece like that of a standard trumpet made of wood. The instrument has seven to ten finger-holes and is used in contemporary folk instrument orchestras.

See also
Ukrainian folk music

Sources

Humeniuk, A. - Ukrainski narodni muzychni instrumenty - Kyiv: Naukova dumka, 1967
Mizynec, V. - Ukrainian Folk Instruments - Melbourne: Bayda books, 1984
Cherkaskyi, L. - Ukrainski narodni muzychni instrumenty // Tekhnika, Kyiv, Ukraine, 2003 - 262 pages. 

Brass instruments
Ukrainian musical instruments
Belarusian musical instruments